Jean-Pierre Lémonon (born in 1940) is a French priest, theologian and exegete. He is a specialist in the New Testament and in the history of the first century of the Church. He taught theology at the Catholic University of Lyon where he was dean of the faculty of theology.

He took part in the series of programs by Gérard Mordillat and Jérôme Prieur on the birth of Christianity, Corpus Christi (1997-1998), then L'Origine du Christianisme (2003), which caused a great stir in France and Germany after their first broadcast on the Arte channel.

Published works
 Pilate et le gouvernement de la Judée - Textes et monuments, Paris, Gabalda, coll. « Etudes bibliques », 1981  ;
 With Jean Comby, Rome face à Jérusalem. Regards des auteurs grecs et latins, Paris, Cerf, coll. « Documents autour de la Bible », 1992  ;
 Les Épîtres de Paul, II. Romains - Galates, Paris, Bayard, coll. « Commentaires », 1996 ;
 L'Esprit saint, Ivry-sur-Seine, L'Atelier, coll. « Tout simplement », 1998 ;
 Avec Hugues Cousin et et Jean Massonnet, Le Monde où vivait Jésus, Paris, Cerf, coll. « Dictionnaires », 1998  ;
 Editeur scientifique, avec Philippe Abadie, Le Judaïsme à l'aube de l'ère chrétienne. XVIII congrès de l'ACFEB (Lyon, septembre 1999), Paris, Cerf, 2001 ;
 Les Débuts du christianisme, Ivry-sur-Seine, L'Atelier, coll. « Tout simplement », 2003 ;
 Les judéo-chretiens, des témoins oubliés, Cerf, coll. « Cahier Evangile, n°134 », 2006 ;
 Ponce Pilate, Ivry-sur-Seine, L'Atelier, 2007 ;
 L'Épître aux Galates, Paris, Cerf, coll. « Commentaire biblique, n°9 », 2008 ;
 Pour lire la Lettre aux Galates, Paris, Cerf et Médiaspaul, 2017 ;  ;
 Pour lire la première lettre aux Corinthiens, Paris, Cerf, 2017 ;
 Pour lire l'évangile selon saint Jean, Paris, Cerf, 2020  ;
 Le Christ de Paul : Paul a-t-il cru en la divinité de Jésus ?, Paris, Médiaspaul, coll. « Paul apôtre, n°8 », 2022  ;

References 

1940 births
Living people
20th-century French historians
21st-century French historians
Historians of Jews and Judaism